Aḥmad ibn Sa‘īd ibn Sa‘d (d. ) was a sharif of the Zayd clan who served as Sharif and Emir of Mecca from 1770 to 1773.

After the death of his brother Musa'id in late Muharram 1184 AH (May 1770) his brother Abd Allah succeeded to the Emirate, having been nominated by Musa'id before his death. Ahmad, desiring the Emirate for himself, deposed his brother and appointed himself as Emir. He sent word to Istanbul of the change in office, but before the customary proclamation and khil'ah (robe of honor) arrived from the capital he was deposed by the ruler of Egypt, Ali Bey al-Kabir, who replaced him with Abd Allah ibn Husayn of the rival Barakat clan. Abd Allah entered Mecca with a forged firman on Friday, 18 Rabi al-Awwal 1184 AH (13 July 1770) supported by Egyptian troops led by Muhammad Bey Abu al-Dhahab, and was installed as Emir on the same day. In early October Ahmad resumed the Emirate after defeating Abd Allah's forces with the support of Bedouin allies.

On 6 February 1773 Ahmad was unseated by his nephew Surur ibn Musa'id, who proclaimed himself Emir of Mecca. In the following years there occurred 15 clashes between the two factions, culminating in a final engagement in Jumada al-Thani 1193 AH (June/July 1779) when Ahmad was captured. Surur imprisoned his uncle first at Yanbu and then at Jeddah, where he died on 20 Rabi al-Thani 1195 AH.

Notes

References

Sharifs of Mecca
Dhawu Zayd
1781 deaths
Year of birth missing
18th-century Arabs